Iordanis Paschalidis (born 1 February 1967) is a Greek yacht racer who competed in the 2004 Summer Olympics and in the 2008 Summer Olympics.

References

1967 births
Living people
Greek male sailors (sport)
Olympic sailors of Greece
Sailors at the 2004 Summer Olympics – Tornado
Sailors at the 2008 Summer Olympics – Tornado
Tornado class world champions
World champions in sailing for Greece